Events in the year 1891 in Belgium.

Incumbents
Monarch: Leopold II
Prime Minister: Auguste Marie François Beernaert

Events

 29 January – Funeral of Prince Baudouin of Belgium.
 2–20 May – Miners' strike in Liège, spreading to other parts of Wallonia.
 10 May – Dock strikes in Antwerp and Ghent in support of coalminers in Wallonia.
 16–22 August – International Socialist Labor Congress of Brussels
 31 August – Brussels Conference Act of 1890 enters into force.
 30 September – French politician Georges Ernest Boulanger commits suicide at the tomb of his mistress in Ixelles Cemetery.
 27 November – New law against tramps and beggars

Publications
Periodicals
 Gazet van Antwerpen begins publication
 Het Volk begins publication
 Annales de la Société d'archéologie de Bruxelles, vol. 5.
 La Jeune Belgique, vol. 10.

Literature
 Jules Destrée, L'oeuvre lithographique de Odilon Redon (Brussels, Edmond Deman)
 Maurice Maeterlinck, Les Sept Princesses
 Stephane Mallarmé, Pages (Brussels, Edmond Deman)
 John of Ruusbroec, L'Ornement des noces spirituelles, translated by Maurice Maeterlinck
 Émile Verhaeren, Les flambeaux noirs (Brussels, Edmond Deman)

Art and architecture

 L'Essor disbands

Paintings
 James Ensor, The Man of Sorrows
 Fernand Khnopff, I lock my door upon myself
 Théo van Rysselberghe, Maria Sèthe at the Harmonium

Births
 19 January – Joseph De Craecker, fencer (died 1975)
 29 January – Henri Van Lerberghe, cyclist (died 1966)
 18 February – Henry George, cyclist (died 1976)
 25 March – Filip De Pillecyn, writer (died 1962)
 2 April – Marthe Crick-Kuntziger, museum curator (died 1963)
 3 May – Henri Rolin, politician (died 1973)
 20 June – Jeanne Hebbelynck, artist (died 1959)
 24 June – René Pinchart, gymnast (died 1970)
 10 August – Andries Mac Leod, mathematician (died 1977)
 7 September – Georges Cuisenaire, educator (died 1975)
 12 September – Jean-François Martial, actor (died 1977)
 18 November – Marie Delcourt, classicist (died 1979)
 23 November – Pierre Ryckmans, governor of Belgian Congo (died 1959)
 9 December
 Léon Bekaert, industrialist and politician (died 1961)
 John Langenus, football referee (died 1952)
 29 December – Alphonse Van Mele, gymnast (died 1972)

Deaths

 4 January – Pierre de Decker (born 1812), politician
 23 January – Prince Baudouin of Belgium (born 1869)
 28 January – Eduard Wallays (born 1813), artist
 4 March – Camille Coquilhat (born 1853), colonial officer
 20 May – Paul Émile de Puydt (born 1810), writer
 31 July – Jean-Baptiste Capronnier (born 1814), glass painter
 17 August – Jean-Joseph Thonissen (born 1817), legal historian and politician
 16 November – Camille van Camp (born 1834), painter
 2 December – Caroline Boussart (born 1808), feminist
 13 December – Jean Stas (born 1813), analytical chemist 
 20 December – Victor Jacobs (born 1838), politician

Date to be determined
 Chantal Coché (born 1826), industrialist

References

 
1890s in Belgium